Torre de Babia (Astur-Leonese: Torre) is a locality located in the municipality of Cabrillanes, in León province, Castile and León, Spain. As of 2020, it has a population of 31.

Geography 
Torre de Babia is located 87km northwest of León, Spain.

References

Populated places in the Province of León